The BM-40A reactor is the nuclear fission reactor used to power four of the seven boats of the Soviet Navy's Project 705 Лира (Lira or Alfa in NATO designation) fourth generation submarines. It is a liquid metal cooled reactor (LMR), using highly enriched uranium-235 fuel to produce 155 MWt of power.

It was developed by OKB Gidropress in cooperation with IPPE.

BM-40A has two steam circulation loops.

See also

 OK-550 reactor

External links
  Project 705 Lira Alfa class  at the Federation of American Scientists website.
 Lead-bismuth cooled reactor plants for nuclear submarines at the Gidropress website.

Soviet naval reactors
Liquid metal fast reactors